"The Boy Racer" is a song by Morrissey, released as a single in 1995, the second single to be taken from the album Southpaw Grammar. It was Morrissey's second and final single release on the RCA record label he had signed to after leaving EMI. The single was released across two CDs, each with different covers but both featuring a young boy. Contrary to rumour, the child is not Morrissey's nephew.

The single reached number 36 on the UK Singles Chart, ten places lower than his last single, "Dagenham Dave".

Track listings

7": RCA / 74321 33294 7 (United Kingdom)
 "The Boy Racer" – 4:47
 "London" (live London 26 February 1995) – 2:38

CD: RCA / 74321 33294 2 (United Kingdom)
 "The Boy Racer" – 4:47
 "London" (live London 26 February 1995) – 2:38
 "Billy Budd" (live London 26 February 1995) – 2:19

CD: RCA / 74321 33295 2 (United Kingdom)
 "The Boy Racer" – 4:47
 "Spring-Heeled Jim" (live London 26 February 1995) – 3:50
 "Why Don't You Find Out for Yourself" (live London 26 February 1995) – 3:51

Musicians
 Morrissey: voice
 Alain Whyte: guitar
 Boz Boorer: guitar
 Jonny Bridgwood: bass guitar
 Spencer Cobrin: drums

Live performances
The song was performed live by Morrissey between 1995 and 2012.

1995 singles
Morrissey songs
Songs written by Morrissey
Song recordings produced by Steve Lillywhite
1995 songs
Songs written by Alain Whyte
RCA Records singles